Mátyás György Seiber (4 May 190524 September 1960) was a Hungarian-born British composer who lived and worked in the United Kingdom from 1935 onwards.  His work linked many diverse musical influences, from the Hungarian tradition of Bartók and Kodály, to Schoenberg and serial music, to jazz, folk song, and lighter music.

Early life
Seiber was born in Budapest. His mother, Berta Patay was a reputed pianist and teacher, so the young Seiber gained considerable skill with that instrument first. At the age of ten, he began to learn to play the cello. After attending grammar school, where he was regarded as "outstanding" in mathematics and Latin according to the almanacs of the Franz Liszt Academy of Music, he studied the cello and composition from 1918 to 1925, and composition with Zoltán Kodály from 1921 to 1925. For his degree, he wrote his String Quartet No. 1 (in A minor). Pieces composed at this time, such as the Serenade for Six Wind Instruments of 1925, show him combining traditional Hungarian folk tunes with the forms of Western art music. He toured Hungary with Zoltán Kodály, collecting folk songs, and built on the research of Kodály and Béla Bartók. He also developed an interest in medieval plainchant.

Career
In 1925, Seiber accepted a teaching position at a private music school. In 1926, he took a position to play the cello in the orchestra of a ship from to North and South America. This was where became acquainted with jazz.

In 1928 he became director of the jazz department at the Hoch Conservatory in Frankfurt, which offered the first academic jazz courses anywhere. His text book Schule für Jazz-Schlagzeug was written in 1929, as a practical summary of his theoretical requirements. Two of his articles of great importance were published in the journal Melos: "Jazz als Erziehungsmittel" (1928) and "Jazz-Instrumente, Jazz-Klang und Neue Musik" (1930). After the jazz department was closed by the Nazis in 1933, Seiber left Germany.

He returned to Hungary but did not settle there; he accepted a position of music referent in the Soviet Union for two years, but his employment was ended after that.

Seiber emigrated to England in 1935 and settled in London, after his marriage in Caterham, Surrey at 169 Stafford Road. He only became a British citizen after the war. Seiber taught composition and cello privately while working as a consultant for the subsidiary of Schott in London and composed film music. Michael Tippett invited him to be a professor of composition at Morley College in London, and from 1942 he was on the staff there; he became a teacher of composition, music aesthetics, and music theory. His students included Don Banks, John Exton, Peter Racine Fricker, Anthony Gilbert, Barry Gray, Karel Janovický, Malcolm Lipkin, Anthony Milner, Wally Stott (who later became Angela Morley), John McCarthy, and Hugh Wood. During this period, he created and trained his choir, the Dorian Singers.

His friendships and work associations embraced many soloists, including Tibor Varga, Norbert Brainin, guitarists Julian Bream and John Williams, percussionist Jimmy Blades, folk singer Bert Lloyd, and tenor Peter Pears.

He was a founder member of the Society for Promotion of New Music, actively promoting new music throughout his life. He was married to ballet dancer Lilla Bauer (1912–2011), another Hungarian émigré. In 1960 he was invited to do a lecture tour in South Africa, but he died there in Kruger National Park as the result of a car accident. Kodály dedicated his choral work titled Media vita in morte sumus to the memory of his former student.

Music
Seiber's music is eclectic in style, showing the influences of Bartók, Kodály, Schoenberg, serialism, jazz, and Hungarian folk song, and his output includes film and lighter music. Often, individual pieces use a combination of these influences. For instance, the two Jazzolettes for wind and percussion (1929 and 1932, composed in Frankfurt) make liberal use of jazz effects and rhythms that displace the bar lines, but also show his first explorations of twelve-note techniques.  His wartime,  Fantasia concertante for violin and orchestra, premiered in 1945 and recorded by Andre Gertler, and the later work Permutationi a Cinque (1948) for wind ensemble, illustrate Seiber's very free use of serialism. Permutationi a Cinque explicitly uses permutations of motifs that eventually come together to reveal a twelve-tone series - but it is all done with lightness and humour.

Seiber's vocal output includes the large scale cantata Ulysses (1947) on words by James Joyce, another Joyce-related work, Three Fragments from "A Portrait of the Artist as a Young Man", and choral arrangements of Hungarian and Yugoslav folk songs. He also wrote one opera, Eva spielt mit Puppen (1934), and the ballet The Invitation. Other works include the two orchestral Besardo suites, a clarinet concertino, three strings quartets, and scores to animated films produced by Halas & Batchelor, including Animal Farm (1954). The substantial Sonata for violin and piano, a commission for the Cheltenham Festival, was completed just before his death in 1960.

Two comic operas, A Palágyi Pekek and Balaton, were composed for the Hungarian theatre in London, the "Londoni Pódium". A Palágyi Pékek, (libretto, György Mikes) (1943), was the first collaboration of Mátyás Seiber and George Mikes. Balaton, (libretto, György Mikes) (1944), as George Mikes has reported, was aired during the war by the BBC and, after the end of the war even made it to Budapest.

A setting of the Scottish "poet and tragedian" William McGonagall's work, The Famous Tay Whale was written for the second of Gerard Hoffnung's music festivals in 1958.

Seiber used a pseudonym for his jazz works and popular music: G. S. Mathis or George Mathis (a rearrangement of his name using Anglicised forms); under this name, he wrote for John Dankworth, most notably 1959's Improvisations for Jazz Band and Orchestra. In 1956 he was awarded the inaugural Ivor Novello award for Best Song Musically and Lyrically for "By the Fountains of Rome," which was a hit that year in the UK Single Charts, making it to the Top Twenty. (The lyrics were by Norman Newell, and it was sung by David Hughes).

Alternative name spellings
There are articles with references to Seiber as Seyber and Mátyás as Matthis.

Compositions (selected)

Orchestral
 Sinfonietta for string orchestra (1925/1964) (from String Quartet No 1, transcribed for string orchestra by Antal Doráti)
 Besardo Suite No. 1 (1940)
 Besardo Suite No. 2 for strings (1942; 14 mins.; Schott; BL)
 Fantasia Concertante for violin and string orchestra (1943; 17 mins.; Ars Viva Verlag, Mainz ; BL)
 Notturno for horn and string orchestra (1944) (8.5 mins.; Schott; BL)
 Concertino for clarinet and string orchestra (1951; 15 mins.)
 Elegy for viola and small orchestra (1954; 8 mins.)
 Tre Pezzi for cello and orchestra (1957; 20 mins.; Schott; BL)
 Improvisations for Jazz Band and Orchestra (with John Dankworth) (1959; 10 min.; BL)

Instrumental and chamber music
 Divertimento for Clarinet and string Quartet ( 1925; Schott)
 Serenade for six wind instruments (1925; Wilhelm Hansen, Copenhagen ; BL )
 String Quartet No. 1 (1925; 18 mins.; BL)
 Two Jazzolettes for 2 saxophones, trumpet, trombone, piano, bass, and drums (1929 and 1932; Wilhelm Hansen, Copenhagen ; BL )
 String Quartet No. 2 (1935; 22 mins.; BL)
 Sonata da Camera (c1948, 15 mins.)
 String Quartet No. 3, Quartettolirico (1951; 23 mins.; Schott; BL)
 Concert Piece for violin and piano (1954; 8 mins.; Schott; BL)
 Fantasia per Flauto, Corno e Quartetto d'archi (1956; Edizioni Suvini Zerboni, Milano)
 Permutazioni a Cinque for wind quintet (1958; 6.5 mins.; Schott; BL)
 Violin Sonata (1960; 20mins; Schott; BL)

Vocal works with orchestra
 Ulysses : cantata for tenor solo, choir and orchestra (1947; 45 mins.; Schott; BL)
 Cantata Secularis: the Four Seasons (text from the Carmina Burana) (1949-1952; 20 mins. Schott; BL)
 Three Fragments from the Portrait of the Artist as a Young Man: chamber cantata for speaker, wordless chorus, orchestra ( 18 min.; Schott; BL)

A cappella choral music 
 Missa Brevis (1924, revised 1950; 14 mins.; Curwen; BL)
 Three Nonsense Songs (lyrics by Edward Lear; 1956)

Songs for solo voice/choral and accompaniment
 Three Morgenstern Songs (1929) for voice and clarinet
 To Poetry (1952; 18 mins.; BL)
 The Famous Tay Whale (text by William McGonagall)( BL)
 The Greek Folk Songs (11 mins.)
 The French Songs (7 mins.)
 Medieval French Songs
 Petőfi Songs (4 Hungarian Folk Songs) (12 m ins.)
 The Yugoslav Folk Songs
 Three Hungarian Folk Songs
 The Owl and the Pussycat (1957) for voice, violin and guitar

Stage/ballet
 Eva spielt mit Puppen (1934) 
 The Invitation (1960; BL)

Selected filmography
 Figurehead (1952, short film)
 The Fake (1953)
 Animal Farm (1954)
 The Diamond (1954)
 A Town Like Alice (1956)
 Robbery Under Arms (1957)
 Chase a Crooked Shadow (1958)

References

Further reading
Hair, Graham. "Matyas Seiber’s Improvisations for Jazz Band and Symphony Orchestra". n-ISM (Network for Interdisciplinary Studies in Science, Technology, and Music) website (accessed 26 January 2019).
 Karolyi, Otto. Modern British Music.: The Second British Musical Renaissance, from Elgar to P. Maxwell Davies. Associated University Presses, 1994.
 Leach, Gerald. British Composer Profiles. A Biographical Dictionary and Chronology of Past British Composers 1800–1979. British Music Society, 1980.
 Lyman, Darryl. Great Jews in Music. J. D. Publishers, 1986.
 Sadie, Stanley (ed.). The New Grove Dictionary of Music and Musicians London: Macmillan Publishers, 1980.
 List of émigré composers in Britain

External links
 
 Online recordings of Mátyás Seiber's music (British Library)
 Mátyás Seiber 2005 centenary website
 The early reception of jazz in Germany: Mátyás Seiber and the Jazz Orchester of the Hoch Conservatory in a radio recording from 1931
 The first jazz theory class at the Hoch Conservatory in Frankfurt, Germany

1905 births
1960 deaths
20th-century classical composers
Twelve-tone and serial composers
British film score composers
British male film score composers
Hungarian emigrants to the United Kingdom
Hungarian classical composers
Hungarian male classical composers
Hungarian folk-song collectors
Hungarian Jews
British jazz composers
Jewish classical composers
British opera composers
Male opera composers
British ballet composers
Musicians from Budapest
Jews who immigrated to the United Kingdom to escape Nazism
Road incident deaths in South Africa
20th-century British composers
Male jazz composers
20th-century British male musicians
20th-century jazz composers
Animated film score composers